The final tournament was held in Poland and Slovenia from 26 August to 11 September 2022.

Italy claimed their fourth title, defeating the reigning world champions Poland and Brazil won the third place match, defeating Slovenia in four sets.

Preliminary round
The top two teams in each pool and the top four of the third placed teams will qualify for the final round.

Combined ranking

Tournament statistics

Attendance
 Matches played : 52
 Attendance (preliminary round) (played 36) : 86,520 (2,403 per match)
 Attendance (final round) (played 16) : 108,092 (6,776 per match)
 Total attendance on tournament : 194,612 (3,743 per match)

 Arena Stožice total attendance (played 30) : 71,038 (2,368 per match)
 Arena Spodek, Katowice, Poland total attendance (played 16) : 83,413 (5,213 per match)
 Arena Gliwice, Gliwice, Poland total attendance (played 6) : 40,161 (6,694 per match)

 Most attendance : 12,258 -  v. , Gliwice, Gliwice on 8 September 2022.
 Fewest attendance : 90 -  v. , Arena Stožice, Ljubljana on 27 August 2022.

Matches
 Most matches wins : 7 - 
 Fewest matches lost : 0 - 
 Most points played in match : 254 -  vs.  2 : 3 (124/130)
 Fewest points played in match : 113 -  vs.  3 : 0 (75/38)
 Longest match played (duration) : 159 min. -  vs.  (2h,39m)
 Shortest match played (duration) : 59 min. -  vs.  (0h,59m)

Sets
 Total sets (preliminary round)  : 126 (3.5 per match)
 Total sets (final round)  : 64 (4.0 per match)
 Total sets  scored : 190 (3.65 per match)
 Most sets played : 27 - , 
 Most sets wins : 21 - 
 Fewest sets wins : 0 - , 
 Most sets lost : 11 - , 
 Fewest sets lost : 4 - 
 Highest set ratio : 5.250 -  (21/4)
 Lowest set ratio : 0.000 - ,  (0/9)

Points
 Total points (preliminary round)  : 5,682 (158 per match)
 Total points (final round)  : 2,834 (177 per match)
 Total points scored  : 8,516 (164 per match)
 Most points wins : 641 - 
 Fewest points wins : 153 - 
 Most points lost : 584 - 
 Fewest points lost : 225 - 
 Highest points ratio : 1.228 -  (620/508)
 Lowest points ratio : 0.680 -  (153/225)

Squads

Coaches 
 Oldest coach: Antonio Giacobbe  – 75 years at the start of the tournament.
 Youngest coach: Michał Winiarski  – 38 years at the start of the tournament.

Players 
 Appearance record: Luciano de Cecco  and Marko Podraščanin  participated in the World Championship for the fifth time.
 Oldest player: At 38 years and 61 days, Mitja Gasparini  is the oldest player ever to be nominated for a 2022 FIVB Volleyball Men's World Championship finals.
 Youngest player: At 17 years and 343 days Mahdi Ben Tahar  is the youngest player ever to be nominated for a 2022 FIVB Volleyball Men's World Championship finals.
 Tallest player: At 2.15 m (7 ft 0.65 in), Yvan Arthur Kody Bitjaa  is the tallest player ever to be nominated for a 2022 FIVB Volleyball Men's World Championship finals.
 Shortest player: At 1.70 m (5 ft 7 in), José Roberto Mendoza Perdomo  is the shortest player ever to be nominated for a 2022 FIVB Volleyball Men's World Championship finals.

Multiple World Championships

Final standing
 Champions   Runners up   Third place   Fourth place

|- 
|colspan=12| Teams eliminated in quarterfinals

|- 
|colspan=12| Teams eliminated in round of 16

|- 
|colspan=12| Teams eliminated in preliminary round

|}
Source: WCH 2022 final standings

Statistics leaders

Awards

See also

2018 FIVB Volleyball Men's World Championship statistics
2022 FIVB Volleyball Women's World Championship statistics
FIVB Volleyball Men's Nations League statistics
FIVB Volleyball Women's Nations League statistics
Volleyball records and statistics
Major achievements in volleyball by nation
List of Indoor Volleyball World Medalists

References

External links
Fédération Internationale de Volleyball – official website
2022 Men's World Championship – official website
Competition formula
Teams
History
Honours
Previous Edition

statistics
Volleyball records and statistics